Church of Pentecost in Markušica is Serbian Orthodox church in eastern Croatia. The church is one of two in the Eparchy of Osječko polje and Baranja that is dedicated to Pentecost. The church was built in the period between 1795 and 1810 at the site of an earlier wooden church dedicated in 1698.

History
Alongside the wooden church in the village, up until the 1796 there was a Serbian Orthodox monastery close to the village, in Mali Antin, as well. The new church in Markušica inherited 1777 iconostasis from the wooden church. During the World War II in Yugoslavia and Genocide of Serbs in the Independent State of Croatia the church was converted into the Roman Catholic one. The most recent icon on the wall were painted in 1989 by Belgrade artist Zoran Đorđević. The church was damaged during the Croatian War of Independence in 1991 when the village of Markušica was a part of the self-proclaimed Eastern Slavonia, Baranja and Western Syrmia. The general restoration works took place after the war in the 1999-2002 period.

See also
Eparchy of Osječko polje and Baranja
Markušica
Serbs of Croatia
List of Serbian Orthodox churches in Croatia

References

18th-century Serbian Orthodox church buildings
Markušica